These are the results of the athletics competition at the 2017 Islamic Solidarity Games which took place on 16–20 May 2017 in Baku, Azerbaijan.

Men's results

100 metres

Heats – May 16Wind:Heat 1: -0.3 m/s, Heat 2: -0.9 m/s, Heat 3: NWI, Heat 4: -0.4 m/s, Heat 5: +0.3 m/s

Semi-finals – May 16Wind:Heat 1: +0.3 m/s, Heat 2: -0.2 m/s, Heat 3: -0.3 m/s

Final – May 16Wind: +0.6 m/s

200 metres

Heats – May 17Wind:Heat 1: +1.4 m/s, Heat 2: +1.1 m/s, Heat 3: +1.0 m/s, Heat 4: +1.3 m/s, Heat 5: -0.2 m/s

Semi-finals – May 17Wind:Heat 1: +0.6 m/s, Heat 2: +1.6 m/s, Heat 3: +0.6 m/s

Final – May 18Wind: +0.6 m/s

400 metres

Heats – May 16

Final – May 17

800 metres

Heats – May 17

Final – May 18

1500 metres

Heats – May 19

Final – May 20

5000 metres
May 16

10,000 metres
May 20

110 metres hurdles
May 17Wind: -1.1 m/s

400 metres hurdles
May 19

3000 metres steeplechase
May 18

4 × 100 metres relay
May 19

4 × 400 metres relay
May 20

High jump
May 19

Pole vault
May 20

Long jump
May 19

Triple jump
May 17

Shot put
May 20

Discus throw
May 16

Hammer throw
May 18

Javelin throw
May 19

Women's results

100 metres

Heats – May 16Wind:Heat 1: -0.6 m/s, Heat 2: -0.3 m/s, Heat 3: +0.9 m/s, Heat 4: -0.2 m/s

Semi-finals – May 16Wind:Heat 1: +0.2 m/s, Heat 2: -0.1 m/s

Final – May 16Wind: +1.1 m/s

200 metres

Heats – May 17Wind:Heat 1: -0.3 m/s, Heat 2: -0.1 m/s, Heat 3: -0.4 m/s, Heat 4: -1.3 m/s

Semi-finals – May 17Wind:Heat 1: +0.4 m/s, Heat 2: +0.1 m/s

Final – May 18Wind: +1.7 m/s

400 metres

Heats – May 18

Final – May 19

800 metres

Heats – May 16

Final – May 17

1500 metres
May 19

5000 metres
May 18

10,000 metres

May 20

100 metres hurdles
May 18Wind: +1.0 m/s

400 metres hurdles

Heats – May 16

Final – May 17

3000 metres steeplechase
May 17

4 × 100 metres relay
May 19

4 × 400 metres relay
May 20

High jump
May 18

Pole vault
May 17

Long jump
May 18

Triple jump
May 16

Shot put
May 16

Discus throw
May 19

Hammer throw
May 16

Javelin throw
May 18

References

Islamic Solidarity Games
2017